Austroharpa wilsoni is a species of sea snail, a marine gastropod mollusk in the family Harpidae, the harp snails.

Description

Distribution

References

wilsoni
Gastropods described in 1973